The Earth Dies Screaming is a 1964 British science-fiction horror film directed by Terence Fisher, written by Harry Spalding, and starring Willard Parker, Virginia Field, and Dennis Price.

Plot
Human bodies are scattered around an English village, apparently dead in a sudden cataclysm. A small group of survivors gathers in the local hotel bar, led by an American jet test pilot, Jeff Nolan. Apparently, a mysterious gas attack has killed off most of the Earth's population. Figures in space suits appear in the streets; Vi Courtland thinks they have come to rescue them, but they turn and kill her with their touch. Several of these bulletproof killers stalk the streets. The remaining group goes to a local Territorial Army drill hall to look for weapons. The group members arm themselves and struggle for survival against the invaders in what is the first step in an alien invasion.

Vi reanimates as a zombie with white eyes. Quinn Taggart shoots and kills her. Quinn knocks out Jeff and heads north with Peggy Hatton in a sports car. She runs off when he stops for petrol. She is trapped in a house pursued by invaders and zombies, and hides in a wardrobe. After the zombie pursuing her abandons the search, Peggy runs outside and is saved by Jeff, who is looking for her. He runs down a space-suited creature with his Land Rover, revealing it is a robot. They go back to the drill hall, where young Lorna Brenard is about to give birth to a daughter. Meanwhile, Ed Otis cannot face the new reality and is drinking anything alcoholic he can find.

Jeff and Mel Brenard use a shortwave radio and triangulation to work out where the aliens are transmitting their control signals to the robots. They locate the transmitter tower and are about to blow it up when robots start to appear, but when the tower is destroyed, the robots collapse. Quinn returns to the village as a zombie. Otis shoots him, saving Peggy, Lorna, and the baby. The survivors commandeer a Pan Am Boeing 707 and fly south in search of other survivors.

Production
Harry Spalding said someone said the title "as a joke" and "somehow it kind of stuck", and he always hated the title.

The film was shot in black and white at Shepperton Studios in London. Location filming was done at the village of Shere in Surrey. It was one of several 1960s British horror films to be scored by the avant-garde Elisabeth Lutyens, whose father, Edwin Lutyens, designed Manor House Lodge in Shere, a small property that features prominently at several points in the film. A collection of location stills and corresponding contemporary photographs is hosted at reelstreets.com.

Cast
Willard Parker as Jeff Nolan
Virginia Field as Peggy Hatton
Dennis Price as Quinn Taggart
Thorley Walters as Edgar (Ed) Otis
Vanda Godsell as Violet (Vi) Courtland
David Spenser as Mel Brenard
Anna Palk as Lorna Brenard

Reviews
Wheeler Winston Dixon wrote about the film's use of silence:

Writing in The Zombie Movie Encyclopedia, academic Peter Dendle cited the film as "an obvious precursor to Night of the Living Dead."

In popular culture
The Earth Dies Screaming was used in 1983 as the inspiration and title for an Atari 2600 video game released by Fox Video Games, a division of 20th Century Fox. The game is set in space, and involves shooting down satellites and fighter ships.

British band UB40 released a single, "The Earth Dies Screaming" (catalogue: Graduate GRAD 10), in 1980, which spent 12 weeks in the UK chart, peaking at number 10.

The first track on Tom Waits' 1992 album Bone Machine is entitled "Earth Died Screaming".

Home Media
The film was released on Region 1 DVD on 11 September 2007, and on Region 2 DVD on 29 August 2011.

References

External links
 The Earth Dies Screaming at IMDB
Review of film at Trailers from Hell

1964 films
1960s science fiction films
British science fiction films
British zombie films
British horror films
British science fiction horror films
Films directed by Terence Fisher
Films scored by Elisabeth Lutyens
20th Century Fox films
Lippert Pictures films
Alien invasions in films
1960s English-language films
1960s British films